The Cove Lake Bathhouse is a historic recreational facility at the Cove Lake Recreation Area, north of Corley, Arkansas in the Ozark-St. Francis National Forest.  It is a T-shaped stone structure, built of fieldstone with a gabled roof.  A porch extends across the front, supported by stone piers. The roof is pierced by three triangular dormers with vents in them.  It was built in 1937 with funding from the Works Progress Administration, and represents a distinctive departure from the more typical Rustic architecture produced by WPA projects.

The building was listed on the National Register of Historic Places in 1995.

See also
National Register of Historic Places listings in Logan County, Arkansas

References

Public baths on the National Register of Historic Places in Arkansas
National Register of Historic Places in Logan County, Arkansas
Buildings and structures completed in 1937
Buildings and structures in Logan County, Arkansas
Ozark–St. Francis National Forest
1937 establishments in Arkansas